Ein Job is a 2008 German television film based on Irene Dische's novel The Job. It was directed by Christian Görlitz and stars British actress Vanessa Redgrave. The German-language production was filmed in Hamburg.

Plot
Victorija (Malektorovych), is a Ukrainian assassin in Hamburg on assignment for the Russian mafia to commit a triple murder. But things are complicated by her neighbour, Hannah (Redgrave) an ageing radical anarchist and Azad (Mehmet), a Turk living in Germany illegally.

Cast
 Vanessa Redgrave as Hannah Silbergrau
 Victoria Malektorovych as Victorija
 Maxim Mehmet as Azad Mem
 Martin Brambach as Bollinger
 Volker Michalowski as Addie
 Judith Steinhäuser as Raisa Gnedenko
 Anna Fischer as Junges Taximädchen

Additional cast;
 Angelika Gersdorf as Kundin
 Kailas Mahadevan as Fahrgast Schlachthof
 Fritz Roth as Boris Gnedenko

References

External links
 

2008 films
2008 television films
2000s German-language films
German-language television shows
German television films
Films based on American novels
Films based on German novels
Films shot in Hamburg
Television shows based on American novels
Television shows set in Hamburg
Das Erste original programming